EOD, EoD, or Eod may refer to:

 Earth Overshoot Day 
 Education Opens Doors, in Dallas, Texas
 Electric organ discharge
 End of data, a control character in telecommunications
 End of day, in business
 End of days (disambiguation)
 Esoteric Order of Dagon, a fictional cult in the Cthulhu mythos of H. P. Lovecraft
 Eves of Destruction, a Canadian roller derby team
 Evolution of Dance
 Explosive ordnance disposal